The House of the Yellow Carpet is a 1983 Italian giallo film directed by Carlo Lizzani.

Plot
Franca and her husband Antonio decide to sell a yellow rug which was a gift from Franca's stepfather. One day, while Antonio is out, a strange man responding to their advertisement rings saying he wishes to buy the rug. But the man's visit becomes a nightmare as he overstays his welcome. He kidnaps Franca and tells her he murdered his wife on that same yellow rug. Franca winds up killing the man.

Cast
Cast adapated from Blood & Black Lace.
 Beatrice Romand as Franca
 Erland Josephson as Achille Cimatti
 Vittorio Mezzogiorno as Antonio
 Milena Vukotic as the psychiatrist

Production and style
The House of the Yellow Carpet was the first film by Carlo Lizzani after his four year tenure as the director of the Venice Film Festival.  The film was adapted from Aldo Selleri's 1978 radio play Teatro a domicilio and was adapted by Filiberto Bandini and Lucio Battistrada. 

Film critic and historian Roberto Curti stated that despite promotional material suggested that the material was part of a "horror-thriller fad", that the film was closer to the gialli of the 1930s. Adrian Luther Smith, echoed this statement referring to the film as a psychological thriller, stating despite some more violent scenes, "the emphasis is on pulling the proverbial rug, er carpet from beneath the audience's feet."

Release and reception
The House of the Yellow Carpet was released in 1983. It was released by Lightning video in the United States as The House of the Yellow Carpet.

Adrian Luther Smith, wrote in his book Blood & Black Lace that viewers "willing to accept a dose of strong black humor with your giallo, then you'll be able to stomach the eccentricities on offer here."

See also
 List of Italian films of 1983

References

Sources

External links

1983 films
Giallo films
1980s psychological thriller films
Films directed by Carlo Lizzani
Films scored by Stelvio Cipriani
1980s Italian-language films
1980s Italian films
Italian thriller films
Films based on radio series